Wedendorfersee is a municipality in the Nordwestmecklenburg district, in Mecklenburg-Vorpommern, Germany. It was formed on 1 July 2011 by the merger of the former municipalities Köchelstorf and Wedendorf.

References

Nordwestmecklenburg